Helcystogramma casca is a moth in the family Gelechiidae. It was described by Annette Frances Braun in 1925. It is found in North America, where it has been recorded from southern Saskatchewan and British Columbia to Utah, Colorado and Oregon.

References

Moths described in 1921
casca
Moths of North America